Arjay is an unincorporated community and coal town in Bell County, Kentucky, United States. Arjay has a post office with ZIP code 40902, which opened on February 23, 1911. The community's name comes from the initials of coal operator R. J. Asher.

Demographics

References

Unincorporated communities in Bell County, Kentucky
Unincorporated communities in Kentucky
Coal towns in Kentucky